is a Japanese actor. He is widely regarded as one of Japan's leading actors, having appeared in a wide range of films from science fiction films such as Shin Ultraman (2022) to small-scale art films such as Dolls (2002). He gained international recognition for his critically acclaimed leading role in the 2021 film Drive My Car, for which he received the Japan Academy Film Prize for Best Actor.

Career
Nishijima became interested in watching films as a child, influenced by his father.
He wanted to be a film crew member, but while in college, he passed the acting audition that his acquaintance encouraged him to take, and he became an actor.

Nishijima made his debut in the contemporary detective television drama series Hagure Keiji Junjōha in 1992.

In 1993, Nishijima gained public recognition for his portrayal of a gay character in the massive hit television series Asunaro Hakusho, which co-starred Takuya Kimura. Nishijima’s subtle performance and good looks in that series attracted attention.

In 1990s, Nishijima gained popularity as a young actor in television series, but left the major talent agency to become a film actor, and did not appear on commercial television from 1998 to 2002.

Nishijima played his first leading role in Kiyoshi Kurosawa's 1998 film License to Live, and co-starred with Kōji Yakusho. He won the Best Actor award at the Japan Film Professional Awards for the film.

Nishijima attracted attention again later, being selected by Takeshi Kitano for the lead role in Dolls in 2002. The film was a major turning point in his career.

In 2009, he was given the Best Supporting Actor award at the Yokohama Film Festival for his portrayal of a strange death row inmate in Vacation.

While establishing himself as a film actor, Nishijima also resumed appearances in television series.

In the 2010s, he became one of the most popular actors in Japan, for his performances in hit television series, such as General Rouge no Gaisen, Strawberry Night, Yae's Sakura, and MOZU.

In 2011, Nishijima had his first starring role alongside Korean actress Kim Tae-hee in the television series Boku to Star no 99 Nichi, a romantic comedy drama about the romance between an actress and her bodyguard.

In Amir Naderi's 2011 film Cut, he played the leading role, which was described by Chris Cabin of Slant Magazine as "the most convincingly pretentious and frustrated cinephile to ever be portrayed on film". His performance in the film was praised by Dan Fainaru of Screen International as "painfully memorable".

He also played the role of Kiro Honjo in Hayao Miyazaki's 2013 animated film The Wind Rises as a voice actor. His other voice work includes dubbing Colin Farrell in Dumbo  and Detective Pikachu (Ryan Reynolds) in Pokémon Detective Pikachu.

In 2017, he became the first Japanese man to model for Giorgio Armani's Made-to-Measure.

He was nominated for the Best Supporting Actor award at the Japanese Academy Awards in 2019 for his performance in Samurai's Promise.

In 2019, Nishijima starred in a television series What Did You Eat Yesterday?, a drama about the daily lives of a middle-aged gay couple. The drama became very popular and was made into a hit film.

In 2021, he starred in Ryusuke Hamaguchi 's film Drive My Car. His performance was highly acclaimed, with The New York Times selecting him as one of the "Great Performers / The Best Actors of 2021". He also won the National Society of Film Critics Award, the  Boston Film Critics Circle Award, and the Japan Academy Award for Best Actor in a leading role for the film.

He has also appeared in films such as Akihiko Shiota's Canary and Kiyoshi Kurosawa's Loft.

In 2022, Nishijima portrayed the role of Kotaro Minami in the remake of 1987's Kamen Rider Black titled Kamen Rider Black Sun.

Filmography

Film

Television

Dubbing roles
 Dumbo (2019), Holt Farrier (Colin Farrell)
 Pokémon Detective Pikachu (2019), Detective Pikachu (Ryan Reynolds)

Awards and nominations

References

External links
 
 
 Hidetoshi Nishijima, The Japan Times (in English)

Living people
1971 births
Japanese male film actors
Japanese male television actors
Japanese male voice actors
Male actors from Tokyo
People from Hachiōji, Tokyo
20th-century Japanese male actors
21st-century Japanese male actors